During the 2016–2021 timeframe, by-elections were held in Tamil Nadu, India, due to the following events:

 25 May 2016 - Tirupparankundram AIADMK MLA S M Seenivel died
 5 December 2016 - Radhakrishnan Nagar AIADMK MLA and CM of Tamil Nadu J. Jayalalithaa died
 18 September 2017 - Disqualification of 18 dissident AIADMK MLAs by speaker
 2 August 2018 - Tirupparankundram AIADMK MLA A.K. Bose died
 7 August 2018 - Tiruvarur DMK MLA, Former CM of Tamil Nadu CM M. Karunanidhi died
 20 February 2019 - Hosur AIADMK MLA P. Balakrishna Reddy convicted by special court
 21 March 2019 - Sulur AIADMK MLA R Kanagaraj died

Events leading to By-Election

The 123 AIADMK members include three independents who contested under the AIADMK symbol. They are M.Thamimun Ansari from Nagapattinam (Manithaneya Jananayaga Katchi), U. Thaniyarasu from Kangayam (Tamil Nadu Kongu Ilaingar Peravai) and Karunas from Tiruvadanai (Mukkulathor Pulipadai).

First By-Election (19 November 2016)
On 26 October 2016, the Election Commission announced that the election for Thiruparankundram, Aravakurichi and Thanjavur constituencies would be held on 19 November 2016. The outcome was:

Second By-Election (21 December 2017)
On 24 November 2017, the Election Commission announced that the election for Radhakrishnan Nagar constituency would be held on 21 December 2017.

Third By-Election (18 April 2019 & 19 May 2019) 
On 13 March 2019, the Election Commission announced that the election for 18 out of 21 vacant constituencies would be held on 18 April 2019. However bypoll for Tirupparankundram, Aravakurichi and Ottapidaram (SC) assemblies were not announced by Election Commission of India as election petitions were pending in court at that time. 
On 9 April 2019, Election Commission announced that the by-elections will be held for remaining four vacant assembly constituencies in Sulur, Aravakurichi, Thiruparankundram and Ottapidaram on 19 May 2019 during the last phase of the Lok Sabha elections.

See also 
Elections in Tamil Nadu
Government of Tamil Nadu
Legislature of Tamil Nadu
Tamil Nadu Legislative Assembly by-election, 2019-2020

References 

State Assembly elections in Tamil Nadu
2020s in Tamil Nadu
2010s in Tamil Nadu
2009 State Assembly elections in India
2016 State Assembly elections in India
By-elections in Tamil Nadu